Michael "Mike" Cranston Woods (1 August 1926 - 4 October 2017) is a former Australian rules footballer who played with Melbourne in the Victorian Football League (VFL).

Woods was born in  Melbourne and attended Melbourne Grammar. In 1944, Woods joined the Navy and was commissioned to HMAS Nizam. In 1952, he graduated from the University of Melbourne with a commerce and social science degree. He furthered his studies at the London School of Economics. 

At school Woods excelled in swimming and Australian football. In the navy he won a heavyweight title. After World War II, Woods played football for the Old Melburnians in the VAFA and in 1949 he joined the Melbourne Football Club in the VFL.  He won the best first-year player award and played as a ruckman and defender. In 1950, Woods was selected to represent Victoria in the Australian National Football Carnival. He retired in 1953.

Notes

External links 

1926 births
2017 deaths
Australian rules footballers from Melbourne
Melbourne Football Club players
Old Melburnians Football Club players
Royal Australian Navy personnel of World War II
Military personnel from Melbourne
University of Melbourne alumni sportspeople
Alumni of the London School of Economics
People educated at Melbourne Grammar School